Fingerlings 3 is the third in Andrew Bird’s series of live albums called Fingerlings. Unlike the previous Fingerlings, Fingerlings 3 contains songs not recorded live in front of an audience; "Dear Dirty" is a studio track and "The Water Jet Cilice" and "Ethiobirds" were recorded live (solo) at Andrew’s home studio in a barn in rural western Illinois. Tracks "Dark Matter" and “Scythian Empire" are live recordings of songs that were later included on Bird's 2007 album Armchair Apocrypha.

Track listing

References

Andrew Bird albums
2006 live albums